Paul Allan David (May 24, 1935 – January 23, 2023) was an American academic economist, noted for his work on the economics of scientific progress and technical change. He was also well-known for his work in American economic history and in demographic economics.

Early life and education 
David was born into a Jewish family in New York on May 24, 1935. His father was a history professor at Columbia University. He enrolled at Harvard University specializing in chemistry. However, he switched to studying economics after struggling with chemistry, where he studied under American economist Alexander Gerschenkron. He graduated from Harvard in 1956.

After graduating from Harvard, he went to the University of Cambridge for two years, before returning to Harvard. It is noted that he started his dissertation on the economic history of Chicago. However, he did not turn it in. He received a Ph.D. from Harvard in 1973.

Career 
David started his academic career at Stanford University in 1961. Here he focused on studying economic change and innovation.

David was a president of the Economic History Association and was a fellow of the Econometric Society, a fellow of the American Academy of Arts and Sciences, a fellow of the British Academy, a fellow of the Oxford Internet Institute and All Souls College, Oxford, a member of the American Philosophical Society, a professor emeritus and senior fellow of Stanford University's Institute for Economic Policy Research, and professorial fellow at the UNU-MERIT.

Notable works 
David's work focused on the history of technological change and its economic impact. He has written several  papers and books on this topic, including "Clio and the Economics of QWERTY" (1985), "The Dynamo and the Computer: An Historical Perspective on the Modern Productivity Paradox" (1990), and Path Dependence, Its Critics and the Quest for Historical Economics (1997). He has also made important contributions to our understanding of the economics of intellectual property, the history of telecommunications, and the economics of innovation. His studies also covered disparate topics including nuclear power plants, migration, slavery, birth control, and government interventions in the economy.

In 2006, Edward Elgar published a festschrift called New Frontiers in the Economics of Innovation and New Technology: Essays in Honour of Paul A. David.

Personal life and death 
David was married to Sheila Ryan Johansson-David, a historian. The couple had two children. An earlier marriage to Janet M. Williamson in 1958 had ended in a divorce. He had two children from this earlier marriage.

David died on January 23, 2023, at age 87.

Academic honors
 Fellow of the International Econometrics Society (1975)
 Pitt Professor of American History and Institutions at the University of Cambridge
 Fellow of the American Academy of Arts and Sciences (1979)
 Vice-president and president of the Economic History Association (1988–1989)
 Marshall Lecturer at the University of Cambridge
 President of the Economic History Association

Publications
Reinterpreting Economic Growth: Parables and Realities, with Moses Abramovitz, American Economic Review, 1973
"Clio and the Economics of QWERTY", American Economic Review, 1985 
Technical Choice, Innovation and Economic Growth (1975)
The Economic Future in Historical Perspective (2003)

See also
 QWERTY—About which David wrote

References

External links 
 Biography at SIEPR
 LinkedIn profile
 In Memoriam by Luc Soete

1935 births
2023 deaths
American economists
Innovation economists
Fellows of All Souls College, Oxford
Fellows of the American Academy of Arts and Sciences
Fellows of the British Academy
Fellows of the Econometric Society
Stanford University Department of Economics faculty
Academics of the University of Cambridge
Academics of the University of Oxford
Harvard University alumni
Members of the American Philosophical Society
Presidents of the Economic History Association
People from New York City